Michael Konsel (born 6 March 1962) is an Austrian former professional footballer who played as a goalkeeper.

Club career
Born in Vienna, Konsel started his professional career with First Vienna and moved to local rivals Rapid Wien in 1985. He then played a part in the successful Rapid team in the 1980s, claiming the League crown twice and most prominently losing the UEFA Cup Winners Cup Final 3–1 against Everton in Rotterdam in 1985. He stayed at Rapid for 12 years and captained the side in his last two seasons. In 1996, he played in the UEFA Cup Winners Cup Final for a second time, this time against Paris Saint-Germain in Brussels, which Rapid lost again, this time by a score of 1–0.

In 1997, at 35 years of age, Konsel moved abroad to join Italian side A.S. Roma in Serie A under manager Zdeněk Zeman; although he was initially not well-known in Italy, his impressive performances led him to be voted the best goalkeeper and best foreign footballer of the season in his first year with the club. After an injury-plagued second season in Rome he finished his career at Venezia, where he remained for a season.

In 1996, he was chosen Austrian Footballer of the Year. He was voted in Rapid's Team of the Century in 1999, as well as in the A.S. Roma All Star Team of all-time in 1998.

International career
Konsel made his debut for Austria in an October 1985 friendly match against Yugoslavia, and was a participant at the 1990 and 1998 FIFA World Cup, serving as a back-up to Klaus Lindenberger in the former edition of the tournament. He earned 43 caps at international level in total (no goals scored). His international farewell match was an August 1998 friendly against France, in which game he was substituted by his eternal rival for Austria's first goalkeeper jersey, Franz Wohlfahrt.

Style of play
Considered to be one of the greatest Austrian goalkeepers of all time (having been elected the third-best Austrian Goalkeeper of the 20th Century), as well as one of the best Serie A goalkeepers of his generation, one of the best European keepers of the 90s, and one of Roma's best ever goalkeepers, Konsel was a consistent and efficient goalkeeper, who stood out for his shot-stopping ability and longevity throughout his career. Nicknamed the panther, he possessed good reflexes and, having played both as midfielder and defender in his youth, was also known for his elegance and ability with the ball at his feet, as well as his speed and adeptness when coming off his line to collect crosses or when rushing out to anticipate opponents, and often functioned as a sweeper-keeper throughout his career, in particular in teams which relied on a high defensive line, the offside-trap, and zonal marking systems. One of his main influences as a goalkeeper was Dino Zoff.

Media appearances
Konsel participated in the third season of the Austrian television dance competition Dancing Stars in 2007, coming in seventh place.

Honours
Rapid Wien
Austrian Bundesliga: 1986–87, 1987–88, 1995–96
Austrian Cup: 1984–85, 1986–87, 1994–95
Austrian Supercup: 1986, 1987, 1988

Individual
Best Young Player of the Austrian Bundesliga: 1985
Austrian Footballer of the Year: 1987, 1995, 1996
Austrian Bundesliga Best Goalkeeper of the Year: 1987–88, 1994–95, 1995–96, 1996–97 
Rapid Wien's Team of the Century: 1999
A.S. Roma All-time All-Star Team: 1998

External links
Official web site – Konsel
Rapid stats – Rapid Archive

References

1962 births
Living people
Austrian footballers
Footballers from Vienna
Association football goalkeepers
Austria international footballers
1990 FIFA World Cup players
1998 FIFA World Cup players
Austrian Football Bundesliga players
Serie A players
First Vienna FC players
SK Rapid Wien players
A.S. Roma players
Venezia F.C. players
Austrian expatriate footballers
Austrian expatriate sportspeople in Italy
Expatriate footballers in Italy